Ivory Coast (Côte d'Ivoire) is a sub-Saharan nation in southern West Africa located at 8 00°N, 5 00°W. The country is approximately square in shape. Its southern border is a  coastline on the Gulf of Guinea on the north Atlantic Ocean.

Maritime claims 

Terrain and topography
Ivory Coast's terrain can generally be described as a large plateau rising gradually from sea level in the south to almost  elevation in the north. The nation's natural resources have made it into a comparatively prosperous nation in the African economy. 
The southeastern region of Ivory Coast is marked by coastal inland lagoons that starts at the 
Ghanaian border and stretch  along the eastern half of the coast. The southern region, especially the southwest, is covered with dense tropical moist forest. The Eastern Guinean forests extend from the Sassandra River across the south-central and southeast portion of Ivory Coast and east into Ghana, while the Western Guinean lowland forests extend west from the Sassandra River into Liberia and southeastern Guinea. The mountains of Dix-Huit Montagnes region, in the west of the country near the border with Guinea and Liberia, are home to the Guinean montane forests.

The Guinean forest-savanna mosaic belt extends across the middle of the country from east to west, and is the transition zone between the coastal forests and the interior savannas. The forest-savanna mosaic interlaces forest, savanna and grassland habitats. Northern Ivory Coast is part of the West Sudanian Savanna ecoregion of the Tropical and subtropical grasslands, savannas, and shrublands biome. It is a zone of lateritic or sandy soils, with vegetation decreasing from south to north.

The terrain is mostly flat to undulating plain, with mountains in the northwest. The lowest elevation in Ivory Coast is at sea level on the coasts.

Rivers

The Cavalla River drains the western border area of the Ivory Coast and eastern Liberia. It forms the southern two-thirds of the international boundary between Liberia and Côte d'Ivoire.

The Sassandra River forms in the Guinea highlands and drains much of the western part of the Ivory Coast east of the Cavalla River.

The Bandama River is the longest river in the Ivory Coast with a length of some  draining the east central part of the country.  In 1973 the Kossou Dam was constructed at Kossou on the Bandama creating Lake Kossou.  The capital, Yamoussoukro, is located near the river south of the lake.

The Komoé River originates on the Sikasso Plateau of Burkina Faso, and briefly follows the border between Burkina Faso and Ivory Coast before entering Ivory Coast. It drains the northeastern and easternmost portions of the country before emptying into the eastern end of the Ébrié Lagoon and ultimately the Gulf of Guinea in the Atlantic Ocean.  Its waters contribute to the Comoé National Park.

Climate
The climate of Ivory Coast is generally warm and humid, ranging from equatorial in the southern coasts to tropical in the middle and semiarid in the far north. There are three seasons: warm and dry (November to March), hot and dry (March to May), and hot and wet (June to October).

Crops and natural resources

Ivory Coast has a large timber industry due to its large forest coverage. The nation's hardwood exports match that of Brazil. In recent years there has been much concern about the rapid rate of deforestation. Rainforests are being destroyed at a rate sometimes cited as the highest in the world. The only forest left completely untouched in Ivory Coast is Taï National Park (Parc National de Taï), a  area in the country's far southwest that is home to over 150 endemic species and many other endangered species such as the Pygmy hippopotamus and 11 species of monkeys.

Nine percent of the country is arable land. Ivory Coast is the world's largest producer of cocoa, a major national cash crop. Other chief crops include coffee, bananas, and oil palms, which produce palm oil and kernels. Natural resources include petroleum, natural gas, diamonds, manganese, iron, cobalt, bauxite, copper, gold, nickel, tantalum, silica sand, clay, palm oil, and hydropower.

Natural hazards
Natural hazards include the heavy surf and the lack of natural harbors on the coast; during the rainy season torrential flooding is a danger.

Extreme points 

Extreme points are the geographic points that are farther north, south, east or west than any other location in the country.

 Northernmost point – the point at which the border with Mali enters the Bagoé River, Savanes District
Southernmost point – Boubré, Bas-Sassandra District
 Easternmost point – unnamed location on the border with Ghana south-west of the town of Tambi, Zanzan District
 Westernmost point -  unnamed location on the border with Liberia in the Nuon River west of Klobli, Montagnes District

See also
Subdivisions of Ivory Coast

References

This article uses information published in the World Almanac and Book of Facts (2006) as a reference.